Carvallo's sign is a clinical sign found in patients with tricuspid regurgitation. The pansystolic murmur found in this condition becomes louder during inspiration; this sign enables it to be distinguished from mitral regurgitation.

Pathophysiology 
During inspiration, the venous blood flow into the right atrium and ventricle are increased, which increases the stroke volume of the right ventricle during systole. As a result, the leak of blood from the right ventricle into the right atrium is larger during inspiration, causing the murmur to become louder. During expiration, the leak of blood backwards through the tricuspid valve is lessened, making the murmur more quiet. Conversely, the murmur of mitral regurgitation becomes louder during expiration due to the increase in venous return from the pulmonary veins to the left heart.

Eponym 
The sign is named after José Manuel Rivero Carvallo.

References

External links 

Medical signs
Cardiovascular diseases